Marian Pârșă (3 March 1986 – 13 February 2010) was a Romanian football forward. He died at age 23, after suffering from cancer. In the last year of his playing career he managed to win one league title and played four games in the 2006–07 UEFA Champions League with Sheriff Tiraspol. His father, Costel was also a footballer who played for Flacăra Moreni and Metalul Plopeni.

Honours
Sheriff Tiraspol
Moldovan National Division: 2006–07

References

1986 births
2010 deaths
Romanian footballers
Association football forwards
Liga II players
Moldovan Super Liga players
FC Petrolul Ploiești players
FCM Târgoviște players
FC Sheriff Tiraspol players
Romanian expatriate footballers
Expatriate footballers in Moldova
Romanian expatriate sportspeople in Moldova
Deaths from cancer in Germany